Joshua Jordan-Roberts (born 26 August 1998) is an English professional rugby league footballer who plays as a  and  for the Hunslet RLFC in RFL League 1.

Background
Josh Jordan-Roberts was born in Leeds, West Yorkshire, England. He is the son of the rugby league footballer; Rob Roberts (known by the nickname of "Two Bobs").

He was a pupil at Temple Moor High School, Halton, Leeds, he played rugby league for Temple Moor High School in the curtain raiser before the 2010 Challenge Cup Final between the Warrington Wolves and the Leeds Rhinos at Wembley Stadium, London on Saturday 28 August 2010.

Bradford Bulls
He joined the Bradford Bulls on a loan deal during February 2017.

Rochdale Hornets
On 13 August 2020 it as announced that Jordan-Roberts would join the Rochdale Hornets from the 2021 season on a 2-year deal.

References

External links
Profile at therhinos.co.uk
Academy Profile at therhinos.co.uk
Profile at bradfordbulls.co.uk
Profile at rugby-league.com

1998 births
Living people
Bradford Bulls players
Hunslet R.L.F.C. players
Leeds Rhinos players
Rochdale Hornets players
Rugby league locks
Rugby league players from Leeds
Rugby league second-rows
York City Knights players